Bivona is a surname. Notable people with the surname include:

Gus Bivona (1915–1996), American reed player 
Kevin Bivona (born 1986), American musician and audio engineer